Ibrahim Jihaad Shavee commonly known as Ibrahim Jihad (born 30 November 1980) is a Maldivian actor.

Career
Abdul Faththaah's horror film Eynaa was released in 2004, which appears Sheela Najeeb, Mohamed Manik, Ahmed Shah, Khadheeja Ibrahim Didi, Jihad and Nashidha Mohamed as six colleagues who go on a picnic to a haunted uninhabited island and their battle for survival. The film garnered critical appreciation specially for its technical department and was a commercial success. The following year, Jihad reunited with Abdul Faththaah for his romantic disaster film, Hureemey Inthizaarugaa (2005) cast along with Ravee Farooq, Mariyam Zuhura, Waleedha Waleed and Neena Saleem. The film, heavily relied on the effect of the 2004 Indian Ocean earthquake on the Maldives, received favorable reviews from critics though it failed to perform financially. Jihad played the envious brother who is ready to go extreme extent to destroy's his brother's career and life.

In 2011, Jihad featured as the police officer Shavin in Yoosuf Shafeeu-directed action drama film Insaaf (2011). The film revolves around the disputes between two districts of an island. Upon release, the film received mixed to positive reviews from critics but it failed to be recognized financially. Mohamed Aboobakuru-directed Randhari was Jihad's only release of 2015. His portrayal of the character Waseem, along with the film received negative reviews from critics and did below average business at the box office. The following year, he played the role of Muju, a thief who gets trapped in a haunted house along with a group of friends, in Fathimath Nahula's horror film 4426. Upon release, the film received mostly positive reviews from critics. Ahmed Nadheem of Avas labelled the film as a "masterpiece" and noted his character to be the "catalyst" of the film. His character along with his performance was widely appreciated considering it to be "once in a lifetime" performance. With twenty-five back-to-back housefull shows being screened, 4426 was declared as the highest-grossing film of the year. At the 8th Gaumee Film Awards Jihad received a nomination for Best Actor award.

Jihad's only release of 2017 was Aishath Rishmy's romantic drama Bos. Penned and produced by Fathimath Nahula, the film tells the story of Ibaa (played by Mariyam Azza), a woman from a royal family and her battle with depression after the demise of her father. A reviewer from Avas criticise the film for having resemblance with American coming-of-age romantic drama A Walk to Remember (2002) and Indian romantic drama Sanam Teri Kasam (2016), however considered Jihad's performance and "perfect portrayal" of his character as the few things that saved the film from being a "snooze-fest". Though the film received mixed response from critics, it emerged as the highest grossing Maldivian film of 2017.

2018 was a dull year for Maldivian film-industry with regards to 2018 Maldivian presidential election, hence only one film of Jihad was released during the year; a suspense thriller film Dhevansoora (2018) written and directed by Yoosuf Shafeeu. The film marks Shafeeu's thirtieth direction and features an ensemble cast of twenty-one actors. Revolving around a murder investigating, Jihad played a police officer trying to solve the murder mystery. The film received positive reviews from critics and was considered a "norm-breaker" for the Maldivian cinema. Ahmed Hameed Adam reviewing from VNews applauded Jihad's performance as he maintained "vulnerability and ruthlessness in a stable manner while emoting for the grief of his lost-child in the perfect way". Ismail Nail Rasheed from Raajje.mv echoed similar sentiments towards his acting and wrote: "Jihad's character was faced with a formal yet personal conflict and he delivered the best expressions during each phase". He then starred in the first Maldivian web-series, a romantic drama by Fathimath Nahula, Huvaa. The series consisting of sixty episodes and streamed through the digital platform Baiskoafu, centers around a happy and radiant family which breaks into despairing pieces after a tragic incident that led to an unaccountable loss. The series and his performance as a spoiled carefree young man entrapped in a sin he was hoping to evade were positively received.

Media image
In 2018, he was ranked in the seventh position from Dho?'s list of Top Ten Actor of Maldives.

Filmography

Feature film

Television

Short film

Other work

Accolades

References 

Living people
Maldivian male film actors
1980 births